Kokonor may refer to:

 Kokonur (or Kokonor), alternative name for the Qinghai province of China
 Kokonor Lake, lake in the Kokonur province, China
 Kukkunoor, a village in East Godavari district, Andhra Pradesh, India
 Kuknur, a village in the Yelbarga taluk of the Koppal district, Karnataka, India